Putham Pudhu Kaalai Vidiyaadhaa is a 2022 Indian Tamil-language anthology series, consisting of five episodes directed by Balaji Mohan, Halitha Shameem, Madhumitha, Surya Krishna and Richard Anthony. The series feature an ensemble cast of Aishwarya Lekshmi, Arjun Das, Dhilip Subbarayan, Gouri G. Kishan, Joju George, Lijomol Jose, Nadhiya, Nirmal Pillai, Sananth and Teejay Arunasalam.

A spiritual successor to the Tamil anthology film Putham Pudhu Kaalai (2020), the series was set and shot during the second wave of the COVID-19 pandemic. The series premiered on Amazon Prime Video on 14 January 2022, coinciding with the Pongal festival.

Premise 
The five-episode series, shares stories of love, hope, resilience, and humanity set during the lockdown restrictions, followed by the second wave of COVID-19 pandemic.

Plot 
Mugakavasa Mutham - Police constables Murugan (Teejay Arunasalam) and Kuyuli (Gouri G. Kishan) undertake a heart warming adventure to reunite two lovers. This adventure gives Murugan an opportunity to pursue his own love interest.

Loners - After going through a breakup in the pandemic, Nalla (Lijomol Jose) serendipitously meets Dheeran (Arjun Das) on a virtual wedding together. What follows is a series of deep meaningful conversations that enables them to develop a bond virtually and be alone together.

Mouname Paarvayaai - Yashoda (Nadhiya) and Murali (Joju George) haven't spoken in years despite living in the same house, in the shadow of their unforgotten love. When Yashoda begins to show symptoms of the virus, Murali helps her in taking care which gets them together.

The Mask - Arjun (Sananth) a work from home IT professional, struggles to tell his overbearing parents about his secret relationship. An out-of-the-blue rendezvous with an old friend, Velu (Dhilip Subbarayan), alters the course of both their lives and inspires self acceptance like never before.

Nizhal Tharum Idham - When 30-year-old Shobi (Aishwarya Lekshmi), receives the news of the father's death, she travels to Pondicherry, her hometown. There she discovers what it means to feel alive again, through the redemptive power of the acceptance of grief.

Cast

Episodes

Production 
A spiritual successor to the Tamil-language anthology drama Putham Pudhu Kaalai (2020) was announced on 30 December 2021, by Amazon Prime Video, which exclusively produced and distributed the film to the streaming platform. It was titled as Putham Pudhu Kaalai Vidiyaathaa, whose teaser being released on the same day. The anthology consisted of five short films directed by Balaji Mohan, Halitha Shameem, Madhumitha, Surya Krishna and Richard Anthony. Unlike its predecessor, which was made as a feature film format, the anthology was made as a five-episode web television series. Aparna Purohit, creative head of Amazon Prime Video had stated that "This anthology tells deeper, personal stories. Both the anthologies prove that art can thrive in the toughest of periods".

Music 

The music and original score for the short films is composed by Sean Roldan, Goutham Vasu Venkatesan, Karthikeya Murthy, Kaber Vasuki and Pradeep Kumar. G. V. Prakash Kumar who worked on its predecessor, scored music for the title track of the film. It was released on 10 January 2022, with a promotional music video being uploaded to YouTube. The soundtrack album consisting of six tracks were released on the same day. It featured lyrics written by Kaber Vasuki, Halitha Shameem, Balaji Mohan and Sabarivasan Shanmugam.

The New Indian Express stated that "the album brings out the essence of the anthology of five heartwarming and buoyant stories". A cover version of the title track was performed by the students of IIT Madras, during the annual cultural festival Saarang. Their rendition was individually released on 12 January.

Release 
Putham Pudhu Kaalai Vidiyaadhaa premiered through the streaming platform Amazon Prime Video, on the occasion of Pongal festival (14 January 2022).

References 

Tamil-language web series
Works about the COVID-19 pandemic
Amazon Prime Video original programming
2022 Tamil-language television series debuts
Tamil-language anthology television series
2022 Tamil-language television series endings